The prelude and fugue is a musical form generally consisting of two movements in the same key for solo keyboard. In classical music, the combination of prelude and fugue is one with a long history.  Many composers have written works of this kind.  The use of this format is generally inspired by Johann Sebastian Bach's two books of preludes and fugues — The Well-Tempered Clavier — completed in 1722 and 1742 respectively. Bach, however, was not the first to compose such a set: Johann Caspar Ferdinand Fischer wrote a 20-key cycle in his 1702 work Ariadne musica.

A number of composers wrote sets of pieces covering all 24 major and/or minor keys.  Many of these have been sets of 24 preludes and fugues, or 24 preludes.

The first movement may be alternatively titled, resulting in a fantasy and fugue, or a toccata and fugue, among others.

Works 

The following works employ, sometimes loosely, the prelude-and-fugue format.

 Johann Caspar Ferdinand Fischer: Ariadne musica (1702)
 Johann Sebastian Bach:
 Prelude (Toccata) and Fugue in E major, BWV 566 (ca. 1705)
 Prelude and Fugue in A minor, BWV 543 (sometime around 1708–1717)
 Prelude and Fugue in B minor, BWV 544
 Prelude and Fugue in C minor, BWV 546
 Prelude and Fugue in E minor, BWV 548
 The Well-Tempered Clavier, Books I and II (1722 and 1742)
 Uncertain (formerly attributed to Johann Sebastian Bach) – Eight Short Preludes and Fugues
 Felix Mendelssohn: Six Preludes and Fugues Op. 35 (1827/37)
 Franz Liszt:
 Fantasy and Fugue on the chorale Ad nos ad salutarem undam (1850)
 Fantasy and Fugue on the Theme B-A-C-H (1855 rev. 1870)
 César Franck: Prélude, Choral et Fugue (1884)
 Max Reger: Introduktion, Passacaglia und Fuge
 Paul Hindemith: Ludus Tonalis (1942)
 Leonard Bernstein: Prelude, Fugue, and Riffs (1949)
 Dmitri Shostakovich: 24 Preludes and Fugues, Op. 87 (1950–51)

Composers 
The composers listed below, who lived and composed in the 19th and 20th centuries, employed this format.
Mark Alburger, 12 Topical Preludes and Fugues
Algernon Ashton
Mario Castelnuovo-Tedesco
David Cope, 48 Preludes and Fugues
David Diamond, 52 Preludes and Fugues
Hiroshi Hara
Hans Huber
Alexander Iakovtchouk
Andersen Viana - Sinfonia Amerindia/Prelude and Fugue
 David Johnson, 12 Preludes and Fugues
A. A. Klengel
Trygve Madsen, 24 Preludes and Fugues for piano, Op. 101
Henry Martin
Felix Mendelssohn
Bruce Cameron Munson
Frank Tveor Nordensten
Camille Saint-Saëns, 3 Preludes and Fugues, Opp. 99 & 109
Vsevolod Zaderatsky, 24 Preludes and Fugues, 1937-39
Dmitri Shostakovich, 24 Preludes and Fugues, Op. 87, 1950–51
Dmitri Kabalevsky, 6 Preludes and Fugues for piano, Op. 61, 1958–59
Rodion Shchedrin, 24 Preludes and Fugues for piano, composed in 1964 and 1970
Igor Rekhin (b. 1941 in Tambov, Russia), 24 Preludes and Fugues for solo Guitar, 1990
Sergei Slonimsky, 24 Preludes and Fugues for piano, 1994
Nikolai Kapustin, 24 Preludes and Fugues, Op. 82, 1997

Musical forms